The East Branch Piscataqua River is a  river in Maine. It is a tributary of the Piscataqua River, which flows to the Presumpscot River and ultimately to Casco Bay.

The East Branch rises between the towns of Yarmouth and North Yarmouth and flows southwest into Cumberland and eventually Falmouth, where it joins the Piscataqua just upstream from that river's mouth at the Presumpscot River.

See also
List of rivers of Maine

References

Maine Streamflow Data from the USGS
Maine Watershed Data From Environmental Protection Agency

Landforms of Yarmouth, Maine
Rivers of Cumberland County, Maine
North Yarmouth, Maine
Cumberland, Maine
Falmouth, Maine
Rivers of Maine